was a weekday morning news program airing on Fuji TV in Japan. It was first broadcast on April 1, 1999, and currently airs from 08:00 to 09:50 Mondays to Fridays. Air time of this program previously was from 8:00 to 9:55 until March 29, 2013. The program ended on March 26, 2021, and was replaced by Mezamashi 8 by the following week.

Presenters

Main presenters

Anchor 
 Tomoaki Ogura (April 1, 1999 – March 26, 2021)

Main assistants 
 Shinsuke Kasai (April 1, 1999 – March 26, 2021)
 Yaeko Umezu (March 24, 2014 – March 31, 2019)
 Yuka Ebihara (October 2, 2017 – March 31, 2019)

Sub-assistants 
 Shotaro Kinoshita (March 24, 2014 – March 26, 2021)
 Sayaka Morimoto (October 2, 2006 – March 26, 2021)
 Ayako Yamanaka (March 24, 2014 – March 26, 2021)

Show-biz reporter 
 Chumei Maeda (April 1, 1999 – March 26, 2021)

Weather 
 Takeshi Amatatsu (October 3, 2005 – March 26, 2021)

Past presenters

Main assistants 
 Kyoko Sasaki (April 1, 1999 – March 27, 2009)
 Minako Nakano (March 30, 2009 – June 29, 2012)
 Rei Kikukawa  (July 2, 2012 – September 29, 2017)

Sub-assistants 
 Yutaka Hasegawa (April 2, 2001 – September 24, 2010)
 Daiki Tanaka (September 27, 2010 – March 21, 2014)
 Yumi Kasuga (April 1, 1999 – September 29, 2006)
 Reina Uchida (March 24, 2014 – September 18, 2015)

Former regular commentators
 Dave Spector (Wednesday)
 Hiroko Mita (Wednesday)
 Seiko Niizuma (Thursday)
 Tetsuya Bessho (Friday)
 Manami Hashimoto (Friday)

Notable past commentators
 Kaori Manabe
 Kazuhide Uekusa

Theme music
Opening and ending theme:  "Good One" (Kay, until March 2021)

Past
 April 1999 to March 2003: "Veronica" (Elvis Costello)
 April 2003 to September 2005: "Shout to the Top!" (opening) / "My Ever Changing Moods" (ending) (The Style Council)
 October 2005 to September 2007: "Don't Get Me Wrong" (The Pretenders)
 October 2007 to March 2009: "We Built This City" (Starship)
 April 2009 to March 2011: "Invisible Touch" (Genesis)
 April 2011 to March 2012: "Heaven Is a Place on Earth" (Belinda Carlisle)
 April 2012 to September 2012: "Tell Her About It" (Billy Joel)
 October 2012 to March 2014: "Tubthumping" (Chumbawamba)
March 2014 to March 2018: "Morning Cheers" (pal@pop)
April 2018 to March 2019: "Rainbow" (Kay)
March to September 2019: "Tap Knock DaNce" (Yuta Mori)
September 2019 to March 2021: "Good One" (Kay)

External links
  

Fuji TV original programming
Japanese television news shows
1999 Japanese television series debuts
2021 Japanese television series endings
1990s Japanese television series
2000s Japanese television series
2010s Japanese television series